Mark V. Ziesing is  a small press publisher and bookseller. Active as a bookseller from 1972 to present, Ziesing was active in publishing from the mid-1980s into the late 1990s. The Ziesing publishing imprint specialized in science fiction, horror, and other forms of speculative fiction. Originally based in Willimantic, Connecticut and in partnership with his brother, he published two books by Gene Wolfe under the Ziesing Brothers imprint.  He later published books by  Philip K. Dick, Stephen King, Harlan Ellison, Howard Waldrop, Bruce Sterling, Joe R. Lansdale, and Lucius Shepard, among others. In 1989 he returned to his home state, to Shingletown, California, where he and his wife Cindy continue to operate a catalog-based book selling business under the name Ziesing Books.

Publications

Unless specified, all editions are hardcover and first publications. For most there was also a signed, numbered, limited edition in a slipcase, and for a very few there was an "ultra-limited" version: The Night of the Cooters ultra-limited came with a martin base statue to hold the book, and the Mefisto in Onyx ultra-limited included an actual cage for the book.

 1982/??: Gene Wolfe - The Castle of the Otter (nonfiction collection) [Ziesing Brothers]
 1984/01: Gene Wolfe -  The Wolfe Archipelago (novella collection) [Ziesing Brothers]
 1984/06: Philip K. Dick -  The Man Whose Teeth Were All Exactly Alike (hardback and trade paperback)
 1984/12: Gene Wolfe -  Free Live Free
 1985/01: A. A. Attanasio -  Beastmarks (story collection)
 1985/09: Ian Watson -  The Book of Ian Watson (story collection)
 1986/??: Michael Bishop -  To a Chimp Held Captive For Purposes of Research (reprint; poem broadside; illustrated by J. K. Potter)
 1986/02: Philip K. Dick -  The Man Whose Teeth Were All Exactly Alike (softcover reprint)
 1988/02: Thomas M. Disch -  The Silver Pillow (novelette; soft- and hardcover editions)
 1988/04: Lucius Shepard -  The Scalehunter’s Beautiful Daughter (novella)
 1988/10: James P. Blaylock -  The Last Coin (signed/limited edition only; precedes the trade edition)
 1988/12: Philip K. Dick -  The Dark Haired Girl (collection of previously unpublished fiction and non-fiction) 
 1989/04: Howard Waldrop -  A Dozen Tough Jobs (novella)
 1989/04: Howard Waldrop -  Them Bones (reprint; first hardcover; the limited edition of this and A Dozen Tough Jobs were sold as a slipcased set)
 1989/05: Iain M. Banks -  The State of the Art (novella)
 1989/07: John M. Skipp & Craig Spector, editors -  The Book of the Dead (anthology) 
 1989/09: Tim Powers -  The Anubis Gates (reprint; first US hardcover) [first book published in Shingletown]
 1989/12: Joe R. Lansdale -  By Bizarre Hands (story collection)
 1989/12: Journal Wired (trade paperback magazine)
 1990/02: Ray Garton -  Trade Secrets
 1990/05: Journal Wired #2 (trade paperback magazine)
 1990/05: Kim Stanley Robinson -  A Short, Sharp Shock (novella)
 1990/07: Joe R. Lansdale -  Cold in July (reprint; first hardcover; the limited edition of this and Savage Season were sold as a slipcased set)
 1990/07: Joe R. Lansdale -  Savage Season 
 1990/08: Gardner Dozois, et al. -  Slow Dancing Through Time (collaborative story collection; co-published with Ursus Imprints)
 1990/10: Journal Wired #3 (trade paperback magazine)
 1990/12: Howard Waldrop -  Night of the Cooters (story collection; co-published with Ursus Imprints)
 1991/02: Neal Barrett, Jr.  - The Hereafter Gang
 1991/06: Richard T. Chizmar, editor -  Cold Blooded (anthology)
 1991/09: Ray Garton -  Lot Lizards 
 1992/02: John Shirley -  Wetbones 
 1992/04: Wayne Allen Sallee -  The Holy Terror
 1992/07: John M. Skipp & Craig Spector, editors  - Still Dead (anthology)
 1992/09: Bruce Sterling  - Globalhead (story collection) 
 1993/02: Richard Laymon  - Alarms 
 1993/04: Lucius Shepard  -  The Golden
 1993/09: Pat Cadigan  - Dirty Work (story collection)
 1993/12: Harlan Ellison  - Mefisto in Onyx (expanded reprint; novella)
 1994/03: Harlan Ellison -  Mefisto in Onyx (second printing with slight corrections)
 1994/07: David J. Schow  - Black Leather Required (story collection)
 1994/07: Lucius Shepard  - Sports & Music (chapbook; story collection)
 1994/08: Stephen King -  Insomnia (done in a signed limited and unsigned "gift" editions; the true first edition of this King novel, preceding the trade edition)
 1994/12: Connie Willis  - Remake (novella)
 1994/12: Richard T. Chizmar, editor -  The Earth Strikes Back (softcover; anthology)
 1995/02: Michael Moorcock -  Lunching With the Anti-Christ (related story collection)
 1995/03: Nancy A. Collins  - Walking Wolf
 1996/03: Brian Stableford  - The Hunger and Ecstasy of Vampires
 1996/11: John Shirley -  Silicon Embrace
 1996/11: Michael Whelan -  Something in My Eye (art poster book, done in both hardcover and softcover editions)
 1997/04: Harlan Ellison  - Slippage (story collection)
 1997/09: Kim Newman & Eugene Byrne -  Back in the USSA (linked short story collection)
 1998/05: John Shirley -  Black Butterflies: A Flock on the Dark Side (softcover; story collection)

Miscellaneous

 A Handbook of American Prayer, a novella by Lucius Shepard,  was originally scheduled for publication by Ziesing circa 1998, but was never published.  A novel version appeared in 2004 from Four Walls Eight Windows.
 Alien Graffiti, a collection of selected nonfiction by Michael Bishop was originally scheduled for publication by Ziesing circa 1986/87.  A nonfiction collection by Bishop from PS Publishing appeared in 2005 entitled A Reverie for Mister Ray.

External links
 Publisher's Website

American speculative fiction publishers
Small press publishing companies
Horror book publishing companies
Science fiction publishers